James Tobin (7 April 1898 – 12 July 1978) was an Irish hurler. Usually lining out at corner-back, he was a member of the Kilkenny team that won the 1922 All-Ireland Championship.

Tobin enjoyed a decade-long club career with Urlingford, however, he enjoyed little in terms of championship success.

After being selected for the Kilkenny senior team in 1920, Tobin held his position on the team for the following five championship seasons. He won his first Leinster medal in 1922 before later winning his sole All-Ireland medal after Kilkenny's defeat of Tipperary in the final. Tobin won a second Leinster medal in 1923.

Tobin was married to Anastatia (née Talbot) and had nine children. He died on 12 July 1978.

Honours

Kilkenny
All-Ireland Senior Hurling Championship (1): 1922
Leinster Senior Hurling Championship (2): 1922, 1923

References

1898 births
1978 deaths
Kilkenny inter-county hurlers
All-Ireland Senior Hurling Championship winners